Anthomyia monilis is a species of fly in the family Anthomyiidae. It is found in the Palearctic.

References

Anthomyiidae
Insects described in 1826
Brachyceran flies of Europe
Palearctic insects